Maciej Płaza (born 16 December 1976, in Opinogóra) is a Polish writer, literary scholar and translator of English literature.

Life and career
He has a PhD in literary studies from Maria Curie-Skłodowska University in Lublin. He is a laureate of the Literature in the World Award for his translation of H.P. Lovecraft's collection of short stories The Dunwich Horror and Other Frightful Tales and was nominated for The Tadeusz Boy-Żeleński Translation Work Award for his translation of Arthur Machen's novel The Hill of Dreams.

In 2016, he became the recipient of the Gdynia Literary Prize as well as the Kościelski Award and was also nominated for Poland's top literary prize Nike Award for his collection of stories entitled Skoruń. In 2018, he won the Angelus Award for his novel Robinson in Bolechów becoming the first Polish writer to do so.

Works

Scholarly works
O poznaniu w twórczości Stanisława Lema, Wydawnictwo Uniwersytetu Wrocławskiego, Wrocław, 2006

Novels 
Skoruń, Wydawnictwo W.A.B., Warsaw, 2015
Robinson w Bolechowie, Wydawnictwo W.A.B., Warsaw, 2017
Golem, Wydawnictwo W.A.B., Warszaw 2021

Translations
Christos Tsiolkas, Martwa Europa, Replika, Poznań, 2010
Fredric Jameson, Archeologie przyszłości: pragnienie zwane utopią i inne fantazje naukowe, Wydawnictwo Uniwersytetu Jagiellońskiego, Kraków, 2011 (co-author)
Fredric Jameson, Postmodernizm czyli Logika kulturowa późnego kapitalizmu, Wydawnictwo Uniwersytetu Jagiellońskiego, Kraków, 2011
Brian McHale, Powieść postmodernistyczna, Wydawnictwo Uniwersytetu Jagiellońskiego, Kraków, 2011
H.P. Lovecraft, Zgroza w Dunwich i inne przerażające opowieści, Vesper, Poznań, 2012
H.P. Lovecraft, Przyszła na Sarnath zagłada: opowieści niesamowite i fantastyczne, Vesper, Czerwonak, 2016
Mary Shelley, Frankenstein czyli Współczesny Prometeusz, Vesper, Czerwonak, 2013
Jenny Diski, Lata sześćdziesiąte, Officyna, Łódź, 2013
Kenneth Grahame, O czym szumią wierzby, Vesper, Poznań, 2014
Mark Helprin, Zimowa opowieść, Wydawnictwo Otwarte, Kraków, 2014, (co-author)
Mark Helprin, Pamiętnik z mrówkoszczelnej kasety, Wydawnictwo Otwarte, Kraków, 2014
Marjorie Perloff, Ostrze ironii: modernizm w cieniu monarchii habsburskiej, Ossolineum, Wrocław, 2018
DeSales Harrison, Zostaw ten świat pełen płaczu, Marginesy, Warszawa, 2019
Arthur Machen, Wzgórze przyśnień, PIW, Warszawa, 2020

See also
Polish literature
Silesius Poetry Award

References

1976 births
Living people
Polish writers
Polish translators
Maria Curie-Skłodowska University alumni